Mulligan may refer to:

Arts and entertainment
 Mulligan (games), a second chance given to a player to perform a certain move or action
 Mulligans (film), a 2008 movie
 Mulligan (TV series), an animated sitcom

Places
 Mulligan, Newfoundland and Labrador, Canada, a settlement
 Mulligan Township, Brown County, Minnesota, United States
 Mulligan River, Queensland, Australia
 Mulligan Peak, Victoria Land, Antarctica

Other uses
 Mulligan (surname), people with the surname Mulligan
 Mulligan's, a pub in Dublin, Ireland
 Mulligan Highway, a state highway in Queensland, Australia
 Mulligan, a racehorse that competed in the 1849 Grand National Steeplechase

See also
 Mister Mulligan, the nickname of aviator Ben Howard's Howard DGA-6 plane
 Mr Mulligan (horse), a Thoroughbred racehorse
 Milligan (disambiguation)
 Mulligan Stew (disambiguation)
 "Nancy Mulligan", song by Ed Sheeran